Apamea cariosa is a moth of the  family Noctuidae. It is found in the northeastern United States, including New York, Maryland, Indiana and Virginia. In Canada it is found in Ontario, Quebec, New Brunswick, Alberta, and Manitoba.

The wingspan is about 35 mm.

External links
Image
Moths of Maryland

Apamea (moth)
Moths of North America
Moths described in 1852
Taxa named by Achille Guenée